Benjamin Bonzi was the defending champion but chose not to defend his title.

Giulio Zeppieri won the title after defeating Titouan Droguet 7–5, 7–6(7–4) in the final.

Seeds

Draw

Finals

Top half

Bottom half

References

External links
Main draw
Qualifying draw

Challenger La Manche - 1
2023 Singles